The .30 R Blaser (7.62×68mmR) is a rimmed bottlenecked centerfire cartridge developed for hunting in 1991 by Gerhard Blenk, the then owner of Blaser Jagdwaffen GmbH and Dynamit Nobel which then owned RWS ammunition.

Design
The cartridge is of a new design and was constructed to outperform popular hunting cartridges like the .30-06 Springfield and 7.92×57mm Mauser. When compared with the .30-06 Springfield the .30 R Blaser features an equal maximum chamber pressure of 405 MPa (58,740 psi) piezo pressure - which is fairly high for a rimmed rifle cartridge - but more cartridge case capacity, allowing the use of more propellant. The .30 R Blaser performance does however not reach the power level of .30 caliber magnum cartridges like the .300 Winchester Magnum that feature more cartridge case capacity and higher maximum chamber pressure levels.

The cartridge was commercially introduced in 1992 by Blaser Jagdwaffen (Blaser hunting weapons) and RWS ammunition. As of 2009, RWS is its only manufacturer.

Cartridge dimensions
The .30 R Blaser has 4.94 ml (76 grains H2O) cartridge case capacity. The exterior shape of the case was designed to promote reliable case feeding and extraction in break action rifles.

.30 R Blaser maximum C.I.P. cartridge dimensions. All sizes in millimeters (mm).

Americans would define the shoulder angle at alpha/2 ≈ 20.01 degrees. The common rifling twist rate for this cartridge is 305 mm (1 in 12 in), 4 grooves, Ø lands = 7.62 mm, Ø grooves = 7.82 mm, land width = 4.47 mm and the primer type is large rifle or large rifle magnum depending on the load.

According to the official with C.I.P. (Commission Internationale Permanente Pour L'Epreuve Des Armes A Feu Portative) guidelines the .30 R Blaser case can handle up to  Pmax piezo pressure. In C.I.P. regulated countries every rifle cartridge combo has to be proofed at 125% of this maximum C.I.P. pressure to certify for sale to consumers.
This means that .30 R Blaser chambered arms in C.I.P. regulated countries are currently (2013) proof tested at  PE piezo pressure.

Contemporary use
The versatility of the .30 R Blaser for hunting all kinds of American and European game and the availability of several factory loads and the fact that it uses standard .30 caliber projectiles all attribute to the .30 R Blaser chambering popularity in break action hunting rifles. Loaded with short light bullets it can be used on small European game like fox or medium game such as roe deer and chamois. Loaded with longer heavy bullets it can be used on medium and big European game like wild boar, fallow deer, red deer, moose and brown bear. The .30 R Blaser offers good penetrating ability due to a fast enough twist rate to enable it to fire relatively long, heavy bullets with a high sectional density. The (former) legal banning of (ex) military service cartridges in countries like Belgium, Italy and France, makes that the .30 R Blaser can be used for hunting in such jurisdictions.

See also
 List of rifle cartridges
 7.62 caliber

External links
 Blaser Hunting Weapons website
 The .30R Blaser Rifle Cartridge By Chuck Hawks

References

 C.I.P. CD-ROM edition 2007
 C.I.P. decisions, texts and tables (free current C.I.P. CD-ROM version download (ZIP and RAR format))

30 R Blaser
Rimmed cartridges